The men's shot put event  at the 1995 IAAF World Indoor Championships was held on 10 March.

Results

References

Shot
Shot put at the World Athletics Indoor Championships